Sharptown is a town in Wicomico County, Maryland, United States. The population was 651 at the 2010 census. It is included in the Salisbury, Maryland-Delaware Metropolitan Statistical Area.

History
San Domingo School was listed on the National Register of Historic Places in 2007.

Geography
Sharptown is located at  (38.540630, -75.719021).

Demographics

2010 census
As of the census of 2010, there were 651 people, 251 households, and 176 families living in the town. The racial makeup of the town was 92.6% White, 5.1% African American, 0.5% Asian, and 1.8% from two or more races. Hispanic or Latino of any race were 2.2% of the population.

There were 251 households, of which 35.9% had children under the age of 18 living with them, 52.2% were married couples living together, 11.6% had a female householder with no husband present, 6.4% had a male householder with no wife present, and 29.9% were non-families. 23.5% of all households were made up of individuals, and 9.6% had someone living alone who was 65 years of age or older. The average household size was 2.59 and the average family size was 3.06.

The median age in the town was 39.2 years. 26.1% of residents were under the age of 18; 6.7% were between the ages of 18 and 24; 25.7% were from 25 to 44; 26.8% were from 45 to 64; and 14.7% were 65 years of age or older. The gender makeup of the town was 46.4% male and 53.6% female.

2000 census
As of the census of 2000, there were 649 people, 258 households, and 180 families living in the town. The racial makeup of the town was 94.92% White, 3.70% African American, 0.15% Asian, and 1.23% from two or more races. Hispanic or Latino of any race were 0.31% of the population.

There were 258 households, out of which 32.9% had children under the age of 18 living with them, 54.7% were married couples living together, 10.5% had a female householder with no husband present, and 30.2% were non-families. 26.0% of all households were made up of individuals, and 14.0% had someone living alone who was 65 years of age or older. The average household size was 2.52 and the average family size was 3.00.

In the town, the population was spread out, with 25.3% under the age of 18, 5.2% from 18 to 24, 31.1% from 25 to 44, 21.9% from 45 to 64, and 16.5% who were 65 years of age or older. The median age was 38 years. For every 100 females, there were 88.1 males. For every 100 females age 18 and over, there were 90.2 males.

The median income for a household in the town was $40,200, and the median income for a family was $44,500. Males had a median income of $31,125 versus $18,977 for females. The per capita income for the town was $15,190. About 4.5% of families and 8.1% of the population were below the poverty line, including 14.1% of those under age 18 and 13.3% of those age 65 or over.

References

Towns in Maryland
Towns in Wicomico County, Maryland
Salisbury metropolitan area